Our Biggest Experiment: An Epic History of the Climate Crisis is a book by British writer Alice Bell, published by Counterpoint in September 2021. Reviewed in Foreign Policy, BuzzFeed News, New Statesman, and Undark Magazine, the book unrolls the history of human concern for weather derangement and climate change along the latest centuries to its present  scientific systematization and public prominence.

References 

Climate change books
2021 non-fiction books
Counterpoint (publisher) books